Seodaemun Independence Park is an educational and cultural park located in Hyunjeo-dong, Seodaemun-gu, Seoul, South Korea. The park contains various monuments and buildings, most notably the Seodaemun Prison Museum. The park receives nearly half a million visitors annually.

Overview

The name Seodaemun means literally "West Great Gate." This refers to Donuimun, one of the former Eight Gates of Seoul, which was torn down in 1915. Even though the gate no longer survives, this area of Seoul still carries the name Seodaemun. 

Seodaemun Independence Park contains:

Seodaemun Prison, originally built in 1907, currently a museum
Independence Gate (독립문), completed in 1897, modeled after the Arc de Triomphe in Paris
Plinths of Yeongeunmun Gate, Seoul, which is remnants of intentionally destroyed Yeongeunmun in 1895
Patriotic Martyr Monument
Independence Hall (독립관), rebuilding of a structure originally built in 1407
Statue of Seo Jae-pil, Korean independence activist
Declaration of Independence Monument
Independence Square (the southwest entrance to the park)
Visitor Center

Location 

References

External links 
 Official Seoul City Tourism Independence Park site

Seodaemun District
Parks in Seoul